The Gridiron Association of South Australia (formally the South Australian Gridiron Association until 1990), Gridiron SA, or GASA is the governing body for gridiron (American football) in the state of South Australia, Australia. There are currently five Division One teams registered in the league.

The association has had 3 main venues they have used for their games.  From 1985-1988 they used Norwood Oval. Then from 1989-1996 they used Thebarton Oval and from 1997 - 2009 they have played their games at the Distinctive Homes Hockey Stadium. In 2010, they returned to Thebarton, before moving to Richmond Oval in 2012. All four venues have TV standard light towers which have allowed night games to be scheduled.

League members
Port Adelaide Spartans
UniSA Eagles
Eastside Razorbacks
Southern District Oilers
South City Chiefs

See also

Gridiron Australia

References

External links
South Australian Gridiron Association official site
South Australian Gridiron Officials Association

Amer
South
Sports organizations established in 1985
1985 establishments in Australia